Rhisiart ap Rhys (fl. c. 1495 – c. 1510) was a Welsh-language poet from the cwmwd of Tir Iarll, Glamorgan.

He was the son of Rhys Brydydd and nephew, in all probability, to the poet Gwilym Tew. 36 of his poems are extant.

Bibliography
Eurys I. Roland (ed.), Gwaith Rhys Brydydd a Rhisiart ap Rhys (Cardiff, 1976)

Year of birth uncertain
Year of death unknown
15th-century Welsh poets
16th-century Welsh poets
Welsh male poets